Francis Yaw Osei Sarfo is a Ghanaian politician who served as the member of parliament for the Krachi West Constituency.

Early life and education 
Francis was born on 1 October 1955. He hails from Bejamse, a town in the Volta Region of Ghana. He obtained his BA in Political Science and Geography from the University of Ghana in 1981. He also had his PLC from the Ghana School of Law.

Career 
He is an administrator. He was the managing director of Akpabe Impex Limited. He was also the District Chief Executive from September 1996 to January 2001.

Politics 
He is a member of the National Democratic Congress. He was the member of parliament for Krachi West Constituency in the Volta region of Ghana.

2004 Elections 
Sarfo was elected as the member of parliament for the Krachi West constituency in the 2004 Ghanaian general elections. He was thus the member of parliament for the Krachi West constituency in the fourth parliament of the fourth republic of Ghana.

He was elected with 15,687 votes out of 34,952 total valid votes cast. This was equivalent to 44.9% of the total valid votes vast. He was elected over Kofi Tarkum of the People's National Convention, Kofi Mensah Demitia of the New Patriotic Party; and Alhaji Abu Safiano Baba, Owusu Michael Kwasi and Apraku Kwadwo Sampson- all independent candidates. These obtained 23%, 25.4%,5.1%, 0.3% and 1.3% respectively of the total valid votes cast.

Sarfo was elected on the ticket of the National Democratic Congress. His constituency was a part of the 21 constituencies won by the National Democratic Congress in the Greater Accra region in that elections.

In all, the National Democratic Congress won a total 94 parliamentary seats in the fourth parliament of the fourth republic of  Ghana.

Personal life 
He is married with six children. He identifies as a Christian.

References 

National Democratic Congress (Ghana) politicians
1955 births
Living people
21st-century Ghanaian politicians
Ghanaian MPs 2005–2009
Ghanaian MPs 2009–2013
Ghanaian Christians
People from Volta Region
University of Ghana alumni
Ghanaian MPs 2001–2005